André Fomitschow (born 7 September 1990) is a German professional footballer who plays as a left winger for FSV Jägersburg.

Career
Born in Dresden, Fomitschow started his professional career with the reserve team of VfL Wolfsburg. During the 2011–12 season, he scored his career best of 17 goals in the season. On 10 June 2012, he joined Fortuna Düsseldorf on a three-year contract. On 27 November, he made his first team debut in a 1–1 draw against Borussia Dortmund. On 23 January 2013, he joined Energie Cottbus on a loan deal till the remainder of the season. After featuring 14 times for the side and scoring one goal against 1. FC Kaiserslautern, his loan deal was extended till the end of 2013–14 season on 5 June.

On 20 June 2014, Fomitschow joined 1. FC Kaiserslautern on a free transfer, penning a deal till 30 June 2016. In September 2015, he suffered a ligament injury during a 3–0 defeat against 1. FC Nürnberg.

On 31 August 2016, Fomitschow moved abroad and joined Dutch Eredivisie club NEC Nijmegen on a one-year contract. On 23 June 2017, he signed for Croatian club Hajduk Split on a two-year contract. On 16 July, he made his debut in a 3–1 victory over Lokomotiva. On 26 October, he scored his first goal (from a free kick) for the club in a 1–0 cup victory against Šibenik, which saw his side progressing to the next round. On 11 February 2018, he scored his first league goal in a 5–0 routing of Cibalia.

Personal life
Fomitschow's parents are originally from Saint Petersburg, Russia. His mother-tongue is Russian.

Career statistics

References

External links
 

1990 births
Footballers from Dresden
German people of Russian descent
Living people
German footballers
Association football midfielders
VfL Wolfsburg II players
Fortuna Düsseldorf players
Fortuna Düsseldorf II players
FC Energie Cottbus players
1. FC Kaiserslautern players
1. FC Kaiserslautern II players
NEC Nijmegen players
HNK Hajduk Split players
Regionalliga players
Bundesliga players
2. Bundesliga players
Oberliga (football) players
Eredivisie players
Croatian Football League players
First Football League (Croatia) players
German expatriate footballers
Expatriate footballers in the Netherlands
German expatriate sportspeople in the Netherlands
Expatriate footballers in Croatia
German expatriate sportspeople in Croatia